In a rowing crew, the coxswain (colloquially known as the cox or coxie) is the member who does not row but steers the boat and faces forward, towards the bow. The coxswain is responsible for steering the boat and coordinating the power and rhythm of the rowers. In some capacities, the coxswain is responsible for implementing the training regimen or race plan. Most coaches cannot communicate to boat/coxswain, so the coxswain is the "coach" in the boat. A coxswain is necessary in the first place because the rowers sit with their backs to the direction of travel. 

In most racing, coxswains may be of either sex regardless of that of the rowers, and in fact are very often women, as the desired weight of a cox is generally as close to 125 lbs (USRowing) / 55 kg (World Rowing Federation) as possible; far more females than males fulfill that qualification (see Sex, and Weight, below).

Role 
The role of a coxswain in a crew is to:

 Keep the boat and rowers safe at all times by properly steering the boat (according to the river or regatta rules and safety for the crew)
 Be in command of the boat at all times 
 Coach the crew when the coach is not present
 Provide motivation and encouragement to the crew
 Provide feedback on the crew's performance both in and out of the races
 Make any necessary tactical decisions
 Organize and direct the crew at all times, including when putting the boat away etc.
 Be responsible for the vessel; in the event of a collision, the coxswain is accountable under maritime law as 'Master of the vessel' (although the stroke may sometimes be the captain of the boat).

The coxswain is in charge of the shell. They are responsible for crew safety, which must be the prime concern. Along with steering, their role is to coach the crew.  The cox acts as the coach's assistant, but in the absence of a coach, as is the case in a race, the cox becomes the coach. Being in the boat, the cox has a feel for what the crew need and a good view of technical errors.  The cox needs to translate the coach's concerns into practical calls. The cox must be able to diagnose problems such as balance and coach the crew into appropriate corrective action.  At the start of an outing the cox must be able to take the crew through a technical and physical warm-up so that the coach is presented with a crew which is able to start the training program and has recapped any points that the coach has been emphasising in previous outings. It is essential that the coach and the cox work in good harmony and show respect to each other all the time. It is also essential that the cox is briefed on what the coach wants to achieve in the outing from the point of view of building physical fitness, technical skill, and team spirit.  A cox must be positive, a good motivator and very encouraging. While errors must be spotted and corrected, it is also important to catch someone getting it right where they have been struggling.

Steering the vessel 
Rowing boats are designed for speed, not maneuverability, so steering requires effort.  Coxswains may steer with either the tiller (a cable connected to the rudder), commands for increased "pressure" or strength from rowers on one side of the boat, or both, depending on what is necessary in the situation.  In the most extreme cases, the coxswain may go "full tiller", turning the rudder to its maximum angle, and may enlist the rowers to help the boat turn faster.  This technique is usually reserved for only the sharpest turns, as the sharp angle of the rudder increases drag and upsets the balance of the boat.  For more conventional turns, the coxswain may move the tiller slightly to one side or the other over the course of a few strokes.  To minimize disturbance of the boat's stability, the motion of the tiller must be smooth and not sudden.  The coxswain may also initiate the turn during the drive phase of the stroke, when the propulsive force of the oar blades in the water helps stabilize the boat.  For very small steering adjustments, the coxswain may move the tiller very subtly during the recovery phase of a single stroke.  This technique is most effective at higher speeds and on straight courses, and must be used sparingly as motion of the tiller during the recovery can easily disturb the boat's balance.
  
Some coxswains advocate that the rudder should be applied only during the drive phase (and centered during the recovery phase), citing the fact that the boat is most stable when the oars are in the water and least stable when the oars are out of the water.  The technique that often accompanies this view involves repeatedly moving the rudder back and forth over several strokes, making sure that the rudder is centered before every recovery. However, the rudder has much less steering power during the drive phase because of the very large forward propulsion force it must overcome.  As a result, this technique often causes more boat drag due to longer rudder use, and the back-and-forth motion of the rudder tends to rock the boat.

The cox will also need to take into account the stream and the wind as well as the river.  As a general rule, still waters do not run deep: rather the stream is strongest where the river is deepest. This explains why in The Boat Race coxes tend to steer in the centre of the river.

Coxless boats
A boat without a cox is known as a coxless or "straight" boat. Besides single and double sculls, straight pairs and fours are the most common coxless boats. Because of their speed and lack of maneuverability, eights without a cox are very rare and dangerous.

Sex
Coxswains may be of either sex, regardless of the sex of the rowers, under the rules of the World Rowing Federation, USRowing British Rowing Henley Royal Regatta, Rowing Australia, and Rowing Canada.

Before 2017, the World Rowing Federation (then called "FISA") rules stated that coxswains must be the same sex as the rest of the crew. In 2017, the Federation voted overwhelmingly to change the rule so that the coxswain may now be of any sex under World Rowing rules. All rule changes applied immediately. New Zealand male cox Sam Bosworth was assigned the New Zealand women's eight in March 2017, and when they won the June 2017 World Rowing Cup II in Poznań, Poland, he was the first male cox to win an international women's rowing event.

Weight 
It is advantageous for the cox to be light – as there is less weight for the crew to move. However, weight is generally considered of minor importance compared to steering, coaching, and motivational ability.

The World Rowing Federation minimum weight for coxswains is 55 kilograms (121.25 pounds) in racing uniform. If a cox is underweight they are required to make up the weight with a deadweight up to a maximum of 15 kg, and the deadweight must be carried as close as possible to the cox (usually a sandbag). Articles of racing equipment (e.g. cox boxes, water bottles) cannot be considered as part of the deadweight. Similar deadweight rules are used in the United States.

Cox box 

Coxes in all boats can use a cox box, most models of which show the rate in strokes per minute of the person sitting in the stroke seat (the seat at the rear of the boat, from whom the rate of strokes per minute and timing is taken).

Additional features include:
  a stopwatch started automatically at the first full stroke 
  stroke ratings over time
  GPS speed measurement 
  Ratio of the power phase to recovery (speed of oars through the water versus returning out of the water for the next stroke) 
  500 meter split times 
  Stroke count 
  Metronome for stroke rates

However the primary function of a cox box is to amplify the coxswain's voice, using a  microphone connected to loudspeakers in the boat. This means that the cox needs only to speak for all rowers to hear their voice.

For an eight-man crew three or four speakers are set down the length of the boat; for a four-man crew two speakers are used.  Pairs may not have speakers if coxed from the stern but will have one if coxed from the bow (in front of the rowers).

Historically the cox would have carried (or strapped to their head) a conical, unpowered megaphone to amplify their voice.

Notes

References

Further reading 
 Various Authors. Boys' Life, 1933 — Further information on the role of the Coxswain.

 
Rowing positions